Herbert Bolton may refer to:

Herbert Bolton (palaeontologist) (1863–1936), British palaeontologist
Herbert Eugene Bolton (1870–1953), American historian